AS Fortuna is an Cameroonian professional association football club based in the Mfou, Cameroon. The club was founded in 1998.

History 
The club was founded in 1998.

The club earned promotion to the Elite One Cameroon Championship in 2018. In their first season in 2018, they finished in 14 position. In the 2019 and 2020 seasons they finished in 4th and 2020–21 season in 3rd place.

References 

Association football clubs established in 1998
Football clubs in Cameroon

External links 

 AS Fortuna on Facebook